Agriades asiatica, the azure mountain blue, is a small butterfly found in the Himalayas that belongs to the lycaenids or blues family.

Taxonomy
The butterfly was earlier known as Polyommatus asiatica or as Albulina asiatica.

Range
The butterfly occurs in the Himalayas (Sikkim) and the Central Asian mountains.

Cited references

References
 
 

Agriades
Butterflies of Asia
Butterflies described in 1882